Albert Christopher Robertson (25 March 1914 – 1995) was an English professional footballer who played as a defender.

References

1914 births
1995 deaths
People from Mablethorpe
English footballers
Association football defenders
Grimsby Town F.C. players
Chester City F.C. players
Hereford United F.C. players
English Football League players